Pablo Baños (born December 4, 1982) is a Spanish sprint canoer who competed in the mid-2000s. At the 2004 Summer Olympics, he was eliminated in the semifinals of the K-2 1000 m event where he performed with Javier Hernanz.

References
Sports-Reference.com profile

1982 births
Canoeists at the 2004 Summer Olympics
Living people
Olympic canoeists of Spain
Spanish male canoeists
Mediterranean Games gold medalists for Spain
Mediterranean Games medalists in canoeing
Competitors at the 2005 Mediterranean Games
21st-century Spanish people